Justice Leonard may refer to:

John E. Leonard (1845–1878), associate justice of the Louisiana Supreme Court
Orville R. Leonard (1834–1894), associate justice of the Supreme Court of Nevada